Qaravolan Rural District is a rural district (dehestan) in Loveh District, Galikash County, Golestan Province, Iran. At the 2006 census, its population was 16,202, in 3,995 families.  The rural district has 24 villages.

References 

Rural Districts of Golestan Province
Galikash County